Mohammed Khamis Khalaf (born 23 February 1969) is a Paralympic powerlifter from United Arab Emirates. He represented his country at the Summer Paralympics in 2004, 2008, 2012, 2016 and 2021. In total, he won three medals: two gold medals and one silver medal. He is also the first Paralympic competitor to win a gold medal for the country at the Summer Paralympics.

In 2004, he won the gold medal in the men's 82.5 kg event and in 2008 he won the silver medal in the men's 90 kg event. He failed to win a medal at the men's 90 kg event in 2012. He once again won a medal in 2016: the gold medal in the men's 88 kg event.

In 2019, he competed at the World Para Powerlifting Championships held in Nur-Sultan, Kazakhstan without winning a medal.

In 2021, he competed in the men's 88 kg event at the 2020 Summer Paralympics held in Tokyo, Japan where he left the stage without a successful lift due to a shoulder injury.

References

External links 

 

Living people
1969 births
Place of birth missing (living people)
Paralympic powerlifters of the United Arab Emirates
Powerlifters at the 2004 Summer Paralympics
Powerlifters at the 2008 Summer Paralympics
Powerlifters at the 2012 Summer Paralympics
Powerlifters at the 2016 Summer Paralympics
Powerlifters at the 2020 Summer Paralympics
Medalists at the 2004 Summer Paralympics
Medalists at the 2008 Summer Paralympics
Medalists at the 2016 Summer Paralympics
Paralympic gold medalists for the United Arab Emirates
Paralympic silver medalists for the United Arab Emirates
Male powerlifters
Paralympic medalists in powerlifting
People with polio